Ian Dobson (born 3 October 1957) is a former Australian football (soccer) player who has won the Victorian Premier League Coach of the Year Award twice. Currently, Dobson is Director of Coaching at Green Gully Soccer Club.
Dobson first arrived in Australia in 1982 and played for the Croydon City Arrows in the State League before being snapped up by National League side Preston Makedonia.
Coincidentally Dobson's first coaching role came in 1989 with the Croydon City Arrows in a career which would span three decades to include a National Soccer League Championship with the Melbourne Knights, a National Soccer League Cup, also with the Melbourne Knights, two Victorian Premier League titles with Altona Magic (1995, 1997) and six Victorian Premier League titles with Green Gully.

Honours
As coach;
National Soccer League (Australia) Champion 1995/96(Melbourne Knights)
National Soccer League Cup (Australia) Champion 1996 (Melbourne Knights)
Victorian Premier League (State League) Champion 1995, 1997 -(Altona Magic
1999, 2000, 2003, 2005, 2010, 2011 (Green Gully Cavaliers)
Dockerty Cup Winners 2004 (Green Gully Cavaliers)
Victorian Premier League Coach of the Year
1995 - Ian Dobson (Altona Magic)
1999 - Ian Dobson (Green Gully)

References

1957 births
Living people
Australian soccer players
Melbourne Knights FC players
Footballers from Kingston upon Hull
Hull City A.F.C. players
Preston Lions FC players
Preston Lions FC managers
Hereford United F.C. players
Association football defenders
English football managers
Melbourne Knights FC managers